Rides is an automotive reality TV show produced for the TLC Network. The show's host is automobile enthusiast and amateur racer Jason Priestley. Rides debuted in the summer of 2004 and became TLC's highest-rated series of the year.

Cars
The majority of the cars seen in the show were one-off (non-production) cars or concept cars such as the Ford Shelby GR-1 and the Ford Shelby Cobra Concept.  The show also showed the building aspects and techniques used for creating cars.

External links 
 
 

2004 American television series debuts
2000s American reality television series
2010s American reality television series